East End Lions is a Sierra Leonean professional football club based in the capital Freetown. They  play in the Sierra Leone National Premier League, the top football league in Sierra Leone. East End Lions represents the East End of Freetown, and play their home games at the National Stadium.    The head coach, appointed in 2018 is John Keister.

East End Lions are one of the two biggest and most successful football clubs in Sierra Leonean football history (along with their main rivalry Mighty Blackpool). The club was founded in 1928 and is one of the oldest football clubs in Sierra Leone.

Rivalry
East End Lions have an intense rivalry with fellow powerhouse Mighty Blackpool who have won the National League 10 times. When these two clubs  play each other at the national stadium in Freetown, tickets are often sold out; there is usually a heavy police presence to prevent clashes between their  supporters,

Achievements
Sierra Leone League: 12

 1977, 1980, 1985, 1992, 1993, 1994, 1997, 1999, 2005, 2009, 2010, 2019

Sierra Leonean FA Cup: 3

 1965, 1973, 1980, 1989.

Performance in CAF competitions
CAF Champions League: 4 appearances
1998 – Preliminary Round
2006 – Preliminary Round
2010 – Preliminary Round
2011 – Preliminary Round

African Cup of Champions Clubs: 3 appearances
1981: First Round
1986: withdrew in Preliminary Round
1994: First Round

CAF Cup: 1 appearance
1992 – First Round

CAF Cup Winners' Cup: 1 appearance
1990 – Second Round

Squad (2011–12)

References 

 
EEL
East End Lions
1928 establishments in Sierra Leone
Association football clubs established in 1928